Halina Bashlakova (also Galina Bashlakova, ; born 19 March 1973) is a modern pentathlete from Belarus. She competed at the 2004 Summer Olympics in Athens, Greece, where she finished twenty-first in the women's event, with a score of 4,944 points.

Bashlakova is also a three-time medalist at the World Championships, winning a silver and two bronze in both team and relay events.

References

External links
  (archived page from Pentathlon.org)

1973 births
Living people
Belarusian female modern pentathletes
Olympic modern pentathletes of Belarus
Modern pentathletes at the 2004 Summer Olympics
World Modern Pentathlon Championships medalists
21st-century Belarusian women